Michael Bamiro (born October 9, 1990) is a former American football offensive tackle. He played college football at Stony Brook University. He has also been a member of the Philadelphia Eagles and New York Giants of the National Football League, Montreal Alouettes of the Canadian Football League (CFL), and Washington Valor of the Arena Football League (AFL).

Early years
He attended Pocono Mountain West High School in Pennsylvania. He was an honorable mention all-conference and was the team captain in his senior season.

Professional career

Philadelphia Eagles
On July 16, 2013, he signed with the Philadelphia Eagles as an undrafted free agent. On August 31, 2013, he was released before being brought back onto the practice squad. He was released by the Eagles on August 23, 2014.

New York Giants
Bamiro was signed to the New York Giants' practice squad on November 26, 2014. He signed a futures contract with the Giants on December 29, 2014. On September 1, 2015, Bamiro was waived by the Giants.

Montreal Alouettes
Bamiro joined the Montreal Alouettes (CFL) practice roster on August 14, 2016. He was released by the Alouettes on February 7, 2017, after spending the 2016 season on their practice roster.

Washington Valor
On March 23, 2018, he was assigned to the Washington Valor. He was placed on injured reserve before the start of the season on April 6, 2018, and placed on reassignment on July 2, 2018.

References

External links
Stony Brook bio
Philadelphia Eagles bio

1990 births
Living people
Carolina Panthers players
New York Giants players
Montreal Alouettes players
American football offensive tackles
Canadian football offensive linemen
American players of Canadian football
Stony Brook Seawolves football players
Sportspeople from Brooklyn
Players of American football from New York City
Washington Valor players